Forsaken (literally "Extraterrestrial") (a.k.a. Forsaken: Mission Mars, Mission Mars and Stranded On Mars) is a 2018 Russian science fiction psychological thriller directed by Aleksandr Kulikov. Originally known as "Martian", the movie bears striking similarities to Ridley Scott's 2015 film, and, despite having a different ending, was heavily criticized in Russia and worldwide. It received generally negative reviews.

Plot
In the near-distant future, a space expedition consisting of four astronauts is sent to Mars by Roscosmos. Three of the crewmembers return to Earth, leaving their captain, Alexander Chapaev, alone on Mars. He starts counting his days on the planet, aided only by a still working radio communication with Earth, as well as a robotic drone to keep him company. On Earth, all efforts to bring Alexander back home turn into quarrels between the government and the space agency, until a private investor proposes his help. However, it soon turns out to be a hoax, since the company sending Alexander subsistence for survival decides to turn his broadcast into a reality show, and is not interested in getting the astronaut back to Earth at all. Bereft of his family, Chapaev starts having mind-boggling hallucinations and meets an entity who is revealed to be a sentient Mars lifeform. The film ends with Chapaev not knowing what is real and unreal anymore, while it is hinted that the whole mission was staged only to raise TV ratings among viewers.

Cast
 Andrey Smolyakov as Aleksandr Kovalyov
  as Anna
  as Pyotr Novikov
 Grigory Siyatvinda as Grisha Star
  as Alexey Alexeyevich
  as Aleksandr Chapaev
 Yevgeniya Shipova as news correspondent
 Boris Moiseev as Roman Randolf
 Maksim Surayev as Maksim Surayev

Reception
The film was a clear box office bomb, grossing only around 15 million Russian rubles ($206,000 US) on a 350 million ruble ($4,800,000 US) budget. It was considered the worst-grossing movie in Russian film history, until it was surpassed by Spitak within the same year. Fond Kino released a statement in 2019 in which it officially apologized for having allocated taxpayer income money for the production of this film. In Russia, this is not the first time a federal body has allocated taxpayer money for movies that bomb at the box office, and the gesture itself is infamously considered by Russians to be a part of government corruption.

References

External links 
 
 
 Forsaken on KinoPoisk

2018 3D films
2018 films
2010s science fiction drama films
2010s survival films
Films about astronauts
Films about space hazards
Films set in Moscow
Films shot in Moscow
Mars in film
Russian 3D films
2010s Russian-language films
Russian science fiction drama films
Space adventure films
2018 science fiction films
2018 psychological thriller films